PTU may refer to:

Science and medicine 
 Paroxysmal tonic upgaze, ophthalmological disorder
 Phenylthiourea, an organosulfur thiourea
 Power transfer unit, for aircraft hydraulic systems
 Propylthiouracil, a hyperthyroidism drug

Universities 
 Puducherry Technological University, Pondicherry, India
 Punjab Technical University, Jalandhar, India
 Pyay Technological University, Burma

Organizations 
 Australian Rail Tram and Bus Industry Union or Public Transport Union
 Hong Kong Professional Teachers' Union
 Paratroop Training Unit RAAF, during WWII
 Plumbing Trades Union, UK

Other uses 
 PTU (film), Hong Kong, 2003
 Platinum Airport, Alaska, US, IATA code
 Police Tactical Units (PTUs)
 Professional technical school in the Soviet Union
 , value-added tax in Poland

See also

 
 Police tactical unit (disambiguation)